Eryx whitakeri, also commonly known as Whitaker's sand boa or Whitaker's boa, is a species of nonvenomous snake in the subfamily Erycinae of the family Boidae. The species is endemic to India. No subspecies are recognized.

Etymology
The specific name whitakeri, as well as both of the above common names, are in honor of American-born Indian herpetologist Romulus Whitaker.

Geographic range

E. whitakeri is found in southwestern coastal India in the states of Kerala, Karnataka, Goa, and southern Maharashtra.

The type locality given is "Mangalore, Karnataka State, India".

Habitat
The preferred natural habitats of E. whitakeri are sea beaches and scrub forests.

Description

Diet
E. whitaker preys upon small mice.

Reproduction
E. whitakeri is viviparous.

References

Further reading

Whitaker R, Captain A (2004). Snakes of India: The Field Guide. Chennai: Draco Books. 495 pp. .
Das I (1991). "A new species of Eryx (Boidae: Serpentes: Squamata) from south-western India". Journal of the Bombay Natural History Society 88 (1): 92–97. (Eryx whitakeri, new species).
Jones C (2004). "Sandboas". Reptilia 9 (3): 20–30.
Sharma RC (2003). Handbook: Indian Snakes. Kolkata: Zoological Survey of India. 292 pp. .

External links
Image of Eryx whitakeri at India Nature Watch. Accessed 10 July 2008.

whitakeri
Reptiles described in 1991
Taxa named by Indraneil Das